John Wodehouse, 3rd Earl of Kimberley,  (11 November 1883 – 16 April 1941), styled Lord Wodehouse from 1902 to 1932, was a British peer and Liberal politician. He was a champion polo player.

Background
Wodehouse was the eldest son of John Wodehouse, 2nd Earl of Kimberley. He attended Eton College and Trinity Hall, Cambridge. At Cambridge, he was a committee member of the University Pitt Club. He started playing polo at university, where he was a member of the Light Blue team. He later played for the Old Cantabs team.

He holds the unique distinction of being the only person to win a gold medal at the Olympics in 1920 and a silver medal in 1908, both for polo.

Political career and military service
Wodehouse was elected Member of Parliament for Mid Norfolk at the General Election of 1906. Aged 22 years and 2 months, he was the youngest Liberal candidate at that election. Throughout his service he was Baby of the House of Commons. In the former year he became JP for the county of Norfolk. He sat in parliament until the January 1910 General Election.

Lord Wodehouse was commissioned a Lieutenant in the Norfolk Yeomanry in 1911 and served with them until the beginning of the First World War in 1914.  He served as a captain in the 16th Lancers during the war, when he was wounded and twice mentioned in despatches. He was at the Western Front in France from 1914 to 1917, and on the Italian Front during 1917–18. He won the MC in the latter year, and also received the Italian War Merit Cross. His younger brother, Edward, also served in the 16th Lancers, but was killed in 1918. Another brother, Philip, was also killed during the war.

From outside Parliament he served as unpaid Assistant Private Secretary to the Colonial Secretary, then Winston Churchill, in 1921–22, and was awarded the CBE in 1925. From 1921 to 1933 he remained on the Reserve of Officers.

He succeeded in his father's titles in 1932, enabling him to sit in the House of Lords.

Family
Lord Kimberley married the twice-divorced Frances Margaret Montagu, daughter of Leonard Howard Loyd Irby, on 5 May 1922.

In April 1941, aged 57, he was killed in The Blitz at 48 Jermyn Street, Westminster, London, and was succeeded by his only child, John.

Kimberley's son John was the godson of the writer P. G. Wodehouse, a distant cousin, both being descended from Sir Armine Wodehouse, 5th Baronet. According to Brewer's Dictionary of Phrase and Fable, P. G. Wodehouse based the character of Bertie Wooster on him.

References

External links 
 
 
 

1883 births
1941 deaths
People educated at Eton College
Alumni of Trinity Hall, Cambridge
Polo players at the 1908 Summer Olympics
Polo players at the 1920 Summer Olympics
English Olympic medallists
Olympic gold medallists for Great Britain
Olympic silver medallists for Great Britain
16th The Queen's Lancers officers
British Army personnel of World War I
Commanders of the Order of the British Empire
13
English justices of the peace
Liberal Party (UK) MPs for English constituencies
Recipients of the Military Cross
British civilians killed in World War II
UK MPs 1906–1910
UK MPs who inherited peerages
John Wodehouse, 3rd Earl of Kimberley
Deaths by airstrike during World War II
British sportsperson-politicians
Norfolk Yeomanry officers
English polo players
Olympic medalists in polo